Engilchek is a village in Ak-Suu District, southeast Issyk-Kul Region, Kyrgyzstan. It is situated at the confluence of the rivers Saryjaz and Engilchek. With the closure of the tin mine, the population fell from 5,000 to less than 20 families. As of 2021, its population was 140. It lies at the head of one of the few good roads into the southeast of the province and is therefore a base for mountaineers and serious hikers.  The road west to Ak-Shyyrak has been impassable since at least 2008. Somewhere in the neighborhood is said to be Shaitan Mazar ("the devil's grave") where a UFO supposedly crashed in 1991. The Engilchek Glacier is about 50 km east of the town.

Population

References

Populated places in Issyk-Kul Region